Vijayendra Kumeria (born 12 October 1986) is an Indian television actor.

Personal life
Kumeria was born on 12 October 1986. his hometown is Ludhiana, Punjab, India. He was brought up in Ahmedabad, Gujarat, India. He is married to Preeti Bhatia. In October 2016, they had a daughter.

Career
Kumeria quit his civil aviation job after working for years to pursue acting, having convinced his parents. 

Initially, he faced rejections while doing rounds in production houses at Mumbai. In 2011, he bagged the role of Jolly Bhardwaj in Chotti Bahu, making his television debut. In 2014 Colors TV's Shastri Sisters got him a lead role opposite Ishita Ganguly.

In October 2019, he established a production house Kumeria Productions with wife Preeti.

Television

Guest appearances

References

External links

1986 births
Living people
Indian male television actors
Male actors in Hindi television
Male actors from Ahmedabad
Male actors from Mumbai
Place of birth missing (living people)